The Georgia Bulldogs softball team represents University of Georgia in NCAA Division I college softball.  The team participates in the Southeastern Conference. The Bulldogs are currently led by head coach Tony Baldwin. The team plays its home games at Jack Turner Stadium located on the university's campus.

History

Coaching history

Championships

Conference Championships

Divisional Championships

Conference Tournament Championships

Coaching staff

Notable players
Sources:

National awards
NFCA Golden Shoe Award
Cortni Emanuel, 2018

Conference awards
SEC Player of the Year
Kim Wendland, 2005

SEC Pitcher of the Year
Michelle Green, 2003, 2005

SEC Freshman of the Year
Geri Ann Glasco, 2013

References